General elections were held in Ivory Coast on 7 November 1965 to elect a President and National Assembly. At the time the country was a one-party state with the Democratic Party of Ivory Coast – African Democratic Rally (PDCI-RDA) as the sole legal party. Its leader Félix Houphouët-Boigny was elected president unopposed, whilst the PDCI-RDA won all 85 seats in the National Assembly. Voter turnout was 99.6%.

Results

President

National Assembly

References

Ivory
1965 in Ivory Coast
Presidential elections in Ivory Coast
One-party elections
Single-candidate elections
Elections in Ivory Coast
November 1965 events in Africa